Babbitt is a surname. Notable people with the surname include:

Almon W. Babbitt (1812–1856), early Latter-day Saint leader and first secretary and treasurer of Utah Territory
Art Babbitt (1907–1992), American animator
Ashli Babbitt (died 2021), rioter killed during the 2021 United States Capitol attack
Benjamin T. Babbitt (1809–1889), American businessman and inventor
Bruce Babbitt (born 1938), United States Secretary of the Interior during the Clinton administration
Dina Babbitt (1923–2009), American painter
George T. Babbitt Jr. (born 1942), United States Air Force general
Harriet C. Babbitt (born 1947), American diplomat, attorney, and former First Lady of Arizona
Harry Babbitt (1913-2004), American singer and star during the Big Band era
Irving Babbitt (1865–1933), American academic and literary critic
Isaac Babbitt (1799–1862), American inventor
J. Randolph Babbitt (born 1946), FAA Administrator during the Obama administration
Manny Babbitt (1949−1999), U.S. Marine veteran executed in California
Milton Babbitt (1916–2011), American composer of serial and electronic music
Natalie Babbitt (1932−2016), American author and illustrator of children's books, notably Tuck Everlasting, The Eyes of the Amaryllis, and Knee-Knock Rise
Luke Babbitt (born 1989), American basketball player
Tabitha Babbitt (1779−1853), American inventor

See also
Babbitt (disambiguation)